The Nikon FG is an interchangeable lens, 35 mm film, single-lens reflex (SLR) camera.  It was manufactured by Nippon Kogaku K. K. (Nikon Corporation since 1988) in Japan from 1982 to 1986.

The FG was the successor to the Nikon EM camera of 1979 and the predecessor of the Nikon FG-20 of 1984. These three cameras composed Nikon's first family of ultra compact 35mm SLR camera bodies. Although the FG had a much less advanced shutter than the more expensive Nikons of the day, it had a very sophisticated electronic design compared to earlier electromechanical Nikons.

Features 

 First Nikon SLR with programmed auto-exposure (AE).
 First Nikon SLR with TTL (through the lens) flash exposure control from a standard ISO-type hot shoe.
 Electronically controlled focal plane shutter.
 Exposure compensation dial (−2 EV to +2 EV).
 Audio warning system – advises of under or over exposure.
 Back-up mechanical M90 shutter setting enables use of the camera when batteries are drained.

Body and Design

Body Construction 
Copper silumin aluminum alloy body
Polycarbonate exterior
Leatherette (synthetic) covering
Metal lens mount

Exposure Control and Metering 

The FG's metering system is controlled by a micro-computer which measures center-weighted brightness, using a sensitive silicon photodiode (SPD) sensor. The metering system performs 'instant stop down metering', where the meter reading is taken after the lens is stopped down but before the mirror flips up and the shutter opens.

In 'P' (Programmed AE) mode, the micro-computer calculates stepless aperture (f/stop) and stepless shutter speed using pre-programmed values.

In 'A' (Aperture Priority AE) mode, the micro-computer calculates a stepless shutter speed for a given user-selected aperture value.

In 'M' (Manual Exposure Control) mode, the user selects both aperture and shutter speed, and the metering system provides a suggested shutter speed (indicated in the viewfinder) for the selected aperture.

Viewfinder 
The viewfinder consists of a fixed, eye-level pentaprism providing a magnification of 0.84x, with a 50 mm lens set at infinity and approximately 92% frame coverage.

The focusing screen is a standard Nikon 'K-type' screen with:
 clear-matte/Fresnel field
 central split-image rangefinder spot
 microprism collar and 12 mm-diameter reference circle (indicates center-weighted metering area).

Displayed on the right side of the viewfinder are:
 A vertical shutter speed scale with LEDs to indicate both the user selected and camera suggested shutter speed (in 'M' mode) and the value selected ('P' and 'A' modes) by the camera's metering system.
 Triangular warning LEDs at the top and bottom of the shutter speed scale, to indicate over- or under-exposure.
 A flash ready-light opposite a thunderbolt symbol at the bottom of the shutter speed.

Flash Exposure Control 

The FG was also Nippon Kogaku’s first amateur level SLR to have through-the-lens TTL off-the-film (OTF) electronic flash automation. However this technology was first introduced with the Olympus OM-2 in 1976.  and was also used previously in the Nikon F3 introduced in 1980. TTL OTF flash exposure control is more precise than previous methods as it measures the flash exposure at the film plane rather than at the flash itself. Correct flash exposure is achieved via a SPD cell at the base of the mirror box, which measures light reflected back from the film plane.

The FG can only connect to flashes via the hot shoe connection, as it lacks a PC sync socket. Flashes which do not have a hot shoe can be used with a hot shoe-sync cord adapter.

Lens Compatibility 

 The FG requires Automatic Indexing (AI) Nikkor lenses for P and A modes to function. Lenses with AI capability include AI and AI-s type Nikkor lenses and Nikon Series E Lenses.
 The following Non-AI and AI-converted lenses are not usable with the Nikon FG:
 Non-AI (requires AI modification)
 AI-converted 55mm/1.2 ser.# 184711-400000
 AI-converted 28mm/3.5 ser.# 625611-999999
 AI-converted 35mm/1.4 ser.# 385001-400000
 Fisheye 6mm/5.6 (requires mirror lock-up)
 Fisheye 10mm/5.6 OP (requires mirror lock-up)
 PC Nikkor 28mm/4 below ser.# 180900
 PC Nikkor 35mm/2.8 ser.# 851001-906200
 Reflex Nikkor 1000mm/11 ser. # below 1430000
 Reflex Nikkor 2000mm/11 ser. # below 200311
 Zoom Nikkor 200-600mm/9.5 ser. # below 301922
 Zoom Nikkor ED 180-600mm/8 ser. # below 174180
 Zoom Nikkor ED 360-1200mm/11 ser. # below 17412
 Focusing unit AU-1
 G-type lenses lack an aperture ring and do not couple with the indexing ring on the FG. The P mode does not function. The A mode will suggest a shutter speed for the available light. The aperture can be stopped down by slightly unscrewing the lens.
 Autofocus Nikkor lenses will mount correctly but autofocus does not function. Vibration reduction (if fitted) does not function.
 DX Nikkor lenses will mount correctly, but the reduced image circle does not cover the full 35mm film frame, so there will be more or less strong vignetting, depending on the model. All DX lenses are G-type or E-type lenses, so P and A modes will not be available.
 IX (APS format) lenses extend too far into the camera and may cause damage. The reduced image circle does not cover the full 35mm film frame

Accessories

Motor Drives

MF-15 databack 

 Sequential frame count.
 Sequential frame numbering.
 Time or date stamping on the film.

Nikon Speedlights 

The FG can be used with any dedicated Nikon speedlights (flashes) which support TTL flash exposure, and any non-dedicated flash units in either automatic or manual modes.

Dedicated, hot shoe mounted Nikon speedlights available during the time the FG was manufactured were the SB-E, SB-15, SB-16B, SB-18 and SB-19.

Background and design history 

The 1970s and 1980s were an era of intense competition between the major SLR brands: Nikon, Canon, Minolta, Pentax and Olympus.  This was in part a result of rapid advances in electronics at the time, which allowed new cameras to be released more frequently and with more automated features than had been possible previously.

Between c. 1975 to 1985, there was a dramatic shift away from heavy all-metal manual mechanical camera bodies to much more compact bodies with integrated circuit (IC) electronic automation. As a result of the manufacturing climate of the time, the EM and subsequent FG and FG-20 were released with much lower price points, and more compact and user-friendly bodies than previous Nikons, to appeal to the amateur photographer market.

The FG was intended to improve on the short-comings of the EM (which had no manual override) and to compete with other programmed SLRs of the time, such as the Canon AE-1 Program (released 1981) the Minolta X-700 (released 1981) or the Pentax Super Program (in the USA/Canada; Super A, rest of the world; 1983).

Market Reception 

The FG was well received by many amateur photographers, but was criticised by others due to the lower build-quality and reliability when compared to other Nikons of the same era. The FG has known reliability issues, particularly with its shutter components and ICs.

Compared to Nikon EM and FG-20 

The major improvements of the FG compared to the EM were improved exterior cosmetics, internal printed circuit electronics, the addition of the manual exposure and programmed autoexposure modes, and provision for TTL flash automation.

The FG-20 is a simplified version of the Nikon FG, with no Programmed AE mode, no TTL OTF flash, and no exposure control, but retaining Aperture Priority AE, and manual and auto flash exposure control.

References

Further reading 
 Anonymous.  "Modern Tests: Nikon FG: TTL Flash Icing On The Cake" pp 86–92, 134.  Modern Photography, Volume 47, Number 1; January 1983.
 Anonymous.  Nikon FG Advertisement.  "It's now possible for people who've only admired great pictures to take them."  p 23.  Modern Photography, Volume 47, Number 7; July 1983.
 Peterson, B. Moose.  Magic Lantern Guides: Nikon Classic Cameras, Volume II; F2, FM, EM, FG, N2000 (F-301), N2020 (F-501), EL series.  First Edition.  Magic Lantern Guides. Rochester, NY: Silver Pixel Press, 1996.  
 Stafford, Simon and Rudi Hillebrand & Hans-Joachim Hauschild.  The New Nikon Compendium: Cameras, Lenses & Accessories since 1917.  2004 Updated North American Edition. Asheville, NC: Lark Books, 2003.

External links 

 Nikon FG information page at mir.com.my
 Nikon FG information page from Nikon Corp online archives
 instruction manual (color) at [orphancameras

FG
FG